The Chains is the name given to the north-west plateau of Exmoor, Somerset, England. This plateau lies above the  contour line, and includes the source of the River Barle.

It lies roughly within a triangle of land between Simonsbath, Challacombe and Lynton and has few distinguishing features. The highest point is at Chains Barrow - .

It is a Geological Conservation Review site, recognised as being nationally important for its south-western lowland heath communities and for transitions from ancient semi-natural woodland through upland heath to blanket mire. The Chains provides a palynological record of a mid to late Flandrian vegetation history on Exmoor. The pollen sequence in the peat is calibrated by radiocarbon dating.

On the Chains above Simonsbath is a  reservoir known as Pinkery Pond. It was formed by John Knight and his son in the 19th century by damming the River Barle. The pond was originally intended to be . Its purpose is unknown though likely to be part of a failed irrigation scheme. Close to the pond are the remains of a small canal which would support the irrigation theory.

Long Chains Combe is the site of several standing stones which have been designated as scheduled monuments.

References

Exmoor